The Emblem of Manipur is the state emblem of Manipur, India.  It was officially adopted by the state government on 18 December 1980.

Design
The emblem features a Kanglasha, a mythological creature that is half-lion and half-dragon.

Historic emblems

Government banner
The Government of Manipur can be represented by a banner displaying the emblem of the state on a white field.

See also
 National Emblem of India
 List of Indian state emblems

References

Government of Manipur
Manipur
Manipur
Meitei script
Symbols of Manipur